The 1956 Segunda División de Chile was the fifth season of the Segunda División de Chile.

Universidad Católica was the tournament's winner.

Table

Final

See also
Chilean football league system

References

External links
 RSSSF 1955

Segunda División de Chile (1952–1995) seasons
Primera B
Chil